A fantasy wargame is a wargame that involves a fantastical setting, and employs rules for elements such as magic and non-human intelligent creatures.

History 
The rise in popularity in wargaming of the 1950s through to the 1970s largely coincided with the rise in popularity of J. R. R. Tolkien's The Lord of the Rings novel.  While wargaming was initially focused on historical subjects, other subjects also emerged.  In the late 1960s, linguist M. A. R. Barker began to use wargame-like sessions to develop his fantasy creation Tékumel.  In 1970, the New England Wargamers Association demonstrated a fantasy wargame called Middle Earth at a convention of the Military Figure Collectors Association.  The fantasy supplement to Chainmail (1971) led to the development of the role-playing game Dungeons and Dragons.  Fantasy writer Greg Stafford created the board wargame  White Bear and Red Moon to explore conflicts in his fantasy world Glorantha, though it did not see publication until 1974.

References 

Wargames
Wargames